Salavat is a city in the Republic of Bashkortostan, Russia.

Demographics 
The population according to recent censuses was

History
The city is named after Bashkir national hero Salawat Yulayev. It was founded in 1948 and granted town status in 1954.

Administrative and municipal status
Within the framework of administrative divisions, it is incorporated as the city of republic significance of Salavat—an administrative unit with the status equal to that of districts. As a municipal division, the city is incorporated as Salavat Urban Okrug.

Economy
The city was founded to support the Gazprom Neftekhim Salavat petrochemical plant that is the main local employer. Other factories include glass, textile and clothing factories.

It is a major center of oil refining and petrochemicals. Salavatnefteorgsintez produces liquid fuels, alcohols, butyl, polyethylene of high pressure, nitrogen fertilizers, etc.). The processing capacity of the complex is 11.7 million tons a year.

The oil refinery complex is near pipelines associated with Ishimbay, Shkapova, and Arlan oil fields, Kargaly and Orenburg region gas fields, Karachaganak and Kazakhstan condensates, as well as Sterlitimak chemical enterprise.

Salavatneftemash is a car repair and experimental prototype for the production of steel structures. In addition, JSC Salavatsteklo is a large technical glass plant. Other factories produce concrete and mineral wool products, garments, hunting equipment and jerseys. Food and woodworking production also takes place.

Government
The Head of the administration is Farit Farrakhovich Gilmanov. Larisa Vladimirovna Davydova serves as the Head of Salavat Urban Okrug and the Chairman of Salavatsky Municipal District.

Education and culture
The city has twenty-six secondary educational institutions, including three high schools, three lyceums, one boarding school, and nineteen secondary schools. Music and arts schools are present.

A branch of the Ufa State Petroleum Technical University operates in the city.

Cultural facilities include the Bashkir Drama Theater, four palaces of culture, a movie theater, a museum, and an art gallery.

References

Notes

Sources

Cities and towns in Bashkortostan
Ufa Governorate
Cities and towns built in the Soviet Union
Populated places established in 1948